Annika Hildegard Jankell (born 28 December 1961) is a Swedish television host and journalist. Jankell has hosted Melodifestivalen 2005 and began her career by hosting the music show Listan between 1987 and 1990 on SVT.

Personal life
Jankell has two children with actor Thorsten Flinck, Felice Jankell, born in 1992, and Happy Jankell, born in 1993.

References

1961 births
Swedish television hosts
Swedish women television presenters
Living people
Swedish radio personalities
Swedish women radio presenters
Journalists from Stockholm